The Reworks is a remix album by Australian drum and bass band Pendulum. It was released on 29 June 2018 through Earstorm. Despite being announced as a new album in early 2018, the album sole contains remixed versions of titles that appeared on their three studio albums Hold Your Colour, In Silico and Immersion or had been single B-sides.

Track listing

Charts

References

External links
Pendulum official website

2018 live albums
Pendulum (drum and bass band) albums